Viscount  was an Edo period Japanese samurai, and the 10th daimyō  of Nihonmatsu Domain in the Tōhoku region of Japan. He was the 11th hereditary chieftain of the Niwa clan. His courtesy title was  Saikyō-no-daifu, and his Court rank was Junior Fourth Rank, Lower Grade.

Biography
Nagakuni, known in his childhood as Hōzō was born in Nihonmatsu on May 22, 1834, the 6th son of Niwa Nagatomi. On November 15, 1858 he succeeded to the family headship upon his father's retirement. He continued the joint coastal defense mission at Tomitsu (together with Aizu han) begun by his father. In April 1864, he was ordered by the Tokugawa shogunate to send military forces to increase security duty in Kyoto due to increasing unrest by pro-Sonnō jōi samurai. In September 1865, he was asked to send troops to Kyoto again. These demands, as well as a fire in the Nihonmatsu jōkamachi, seriously depleted the resources of the domain. These expenses were compounded by the economic difficulties the domain faced following the Tenpō famines, as well as bureaucratic corruption. As a result, Nihonmatsu was utterly economically paralyzed by the end of the Bakumatsu period. 

In 1868, with the start of the Boshin War, Nihonmatsu joined the Ōuetsu Reppan Dōmei, but was defeated by the forces of the Satchō Alliance in every engagement. Nihonmatsu Castle fell during the Battle of Nihonmatsu on September 15, 1868 and Niwa Nagakuni fled to Yonezawa Domain. He subsequently made peace with the Meiji government and was ordered to relocated to Tokyo, where he was held under house arrest at the residence of Maebashi Domain. The new government also ordered him to retire from his position, and reduced Nihonmatsu Domain from its kokudaka of 100,700 koku to 50,700 koku. His adopted son Niwa Nagahiro (brother of Uesugi Mochinori of Yonezawa Domain) succeeded him.

In 1869, he was released from house arrest. He outlived both his son and grandson, Niwa Nagayasu, and in 1902 reassumed the chieftainship of the Niwa clan, and also the kazoku title of shishaku (viscount). He died in 1904 and his grave is at Aoyama Cemetery in Tokyo.

Notes

Further reading
 Nihonmatsu-han shi 二本松藩史 (History of Nihonmatsu Domain). Tokyo: Nihonmatsu-hanshi kankōkai 二本松藩史刊行会, 1926 (republished by Rekishi Toshosha 歴史図書社, 1973)
 Onodera Eikō 小野寺永幸. Boshin Nanboku Sensō to Tōhoku Seiken 戊辰南北戦争と東北政権 (The North-South Boshin War and the Northern Government). Sendai: Kita no Sha 北の杜, 2004.
 Sugeno Shigeru 菅野与. Ōshū Nihonmatsu-han nenpyō 奥州二本松藩年表 (Chronology of the Nihonmatsu Domain of Oshu). Aizu-Wakamatsu shi 会津若松市: Rekishi Shunjūsha 歴史春秋社, 2004.

External links
 Genealogical Information (in Japanese)
 Biography (in Japanese)

1834 births
1904 deaths
Niwa clan
Fudai daimyo
People of the Boshin War
Kazoku